Healthcare in Portugal is provided through three coexisting systems: the National Health Service (SNS), special social health insurance schemes for certain professions (health subsystems) and voluntary private health insurance. The SNS provides universal coverage, although in 2012 measures were implemented to ensure the sustainability of the service by the introduction of user fees to be paid for at the end of treatments. In addition, about 25% of the population is covered by the health subsystems, 10% by private insurance schemes and another 7% by mutual funds. The Ministry of Health is responsible for developing health policy as well as managing the SNS. The Health Regulatory Entity (ERS) is the public independent entity responsible for the regulation of the activity of all the public, private and social healthcare providers.  In 2019 the government proposes to scrap all fees, which constitute about 2 percent of the NHS's budget, apart from some hospital emergencies.

Healthcare system

National Health Service (SNS)

The National Health Service (SNS) is the system by which the State assures the right to the health protection, in the terms established by the Portuguese Constitution. It was created in 1979 and operates under the supervision of the Ministry of Health.

The SNS is characterized as being national, universal, general and free. It is national as it should be provided nationwide, although presently it still only covers Continental Portugal. It is universal as all Portuguese citizens and foreign residents have access to it. It is general as it encompasses the whole range of healthcare, including the health surveillance and promotion, the disease prevention, the diagnosis and treatment of patients and the social and medical rehabilitation. It is free, as the system is publicly funded, with the health services being tendentiously free of charge for the users. However, some fees are charged, not in order to finance the system but serving mainly to moderate and filter unnecessary access to the services (e.g. to avoid that a person with a minor injury go to the hospital's emergency department instead of going to a local primary health care unit).

The system is managed by the Central Administration of the Health System (ACSS) and by the five regional health administrations (North, Center, Lisbon and Tagus Valley, Alentejo and Algarve). The ACSS is responsible for the central management of the financial, human, equipment and facility resources of the system, as well as for the establishment of health policies, plans, rules and standards. The regional health administrations are responsible for providing the healthcare services to the populations of their respective regions, as well as to execute the national health plan.

Besides being public funded, the health services provided by the SNS are mainly delivered by public health units. These include:
 Health centers groups (agrupamentos de centros de saúde, ACES) - providing mainly primary health care to the local communities. Each ACES congregates several health centers. There is at least one health center covering each municipality, each of which can have one or more extensions in its jurisdiction. The ACES include specialized units of family and personalized healthcare, community healthcare and public health;
 Hospital establishments - providing mainly secondary health care. Most hospitals are now administratively part of a hospital center (centro hospitalar), which groups and manages together several hospital units located in the same city or region. Independent hospitals and hospital centers are classified as group I (general hospitals), II (district hospitals), III (central hospitals) or IV (specialized oncologic, psychiatric or rehabilitation hospitals);
 Local health units (unidades locais de saúde, ULS) - grouping together the health centers and hospitals located in the same city or region in a single comprehensive administrative unit, which is responsible to provide both primary and secondary health care.

The SNS has also conventions with private entities to provide complementary healthcare services to its users.

Regional health services
Despite the Constitutional and other statutory provisions and being referred as "National", the SNS is not really nationwide, as it was never expanded to the Portuguese autonomous regions, only covering Continental Portugal. In the scope of their devolved powers, the autonomous regions of the Azores and Madeira created their own separate regional health services (serviços regionais de saúde, SRS), managed by the respective regional governments.

The exact status of these regional services and its relation with the SNS is however not clear, as both the Statute of the SNS and the Basic Law of Health are silent about the SRS, with this last one only vaguely mentioning that the health policy in the autonomous regions is defined and executed by the respective bodies of self-government. The question of the status of the SRS was raised when a number of SNS hospitals sued the Regional Government of the Azores to force it to pay the costs of the services provided to residents in the Azores who received treatment in those establishments. The Azorean government argued that the Azores SRS should be considered a regional extension of the SNS, so its users should also have universal access to SNS healthcare free of charges. However, in a decision taken in May 2015, the Supreme Administrative Court considered that the Azores SRS was autonomous regarding the SNS and should be considered a health subsystem, so being obliged to pay SNS for the services provided to its beneficiaries.

The Azores SRS is managed by the regional secretary of Health and is organized in nine island health units (unidades de saúde de ilha, USI), which include 14 health centers, three hospitals and a center of oncology. Each USI groups all the public healthcare establishments located in the same island in a single administrative unit. There are two types of USI. Those that groups both hospital and health centers are similar to the local health units of the SNS, providing both primary and secondary healthcare. USI that groups only health centers are similar to the health centers groups of the SNS and provide only primary healthcare.

The Madeira SRS is managed by the regional secretary of Health. It includes two hospitals, two specialized centers and 15 health centers. All these healthcare units are grouped in a single administrative unit, the SESARAM, EPE (Health Service of the Autonomous Region of Madeira). The SESARAM, EPE is similar to a local health unit of the SNS, providing both primary and secondary healthcare.

Health subsystems

The health subsystems are the special schemes - parallel to the SNS - responsible for the providing of healthcare to the members of certain professions or organizations. The adhesion to them is mandatory for these groups of persons, with its financing being made either by the beneficiaries or by their employers. There are public and private subsystems, with the first type being responsible for the providing of healthcare to public servants and the second to the members of private organizations.

The most important public health subsystem is the ADSE, which covers all public servants not covered by other special schemes. ADSE has more than 1.3 million beneficiaries, including servants of the central, regional and local public administrations. The other public subsystems cover some special groups of public servants and are the ADM for the military personnel of the Armed Forces, the SAD/GNR for the military personnel of the National Republican Guard, the SAD/PSP for the police personnel of the Public Security Police and SSMJ for some special professional groups (prison guards, Judiciary Police agents, probation officers, etc.) of the Ministry of Justice. All these public subsystems are entirely financed by the State.

The private subsystems are mainly characterized by their occupational basis. They cover either members of certain professions - independently of their employer - or cover the employees of specific private organizations. They can be financed by the beneficiaries - usually through a discount in their salaries - or by their employers. Example of private subsystems are the SAMS for the bank employees, the PT-ACS for the employees of Portugal Telecom and the SSCGD for the employees of Caixa Geral de Depósitos.

The subsystems usually provide the healthcare to their beneficiaries both through public and private medical establishments. This is done by previous conventions agreed between the subsystems and the medical services providers (SNS, SRS or private entities) or - when there are not previous conventions - by the post reimbursement of the beneficiaries for the healthcare payments they advanced. Some subsystems are able to provide directly healthcare services through their own medical establishments. This is the case of the ADM through the Hospital of the Armed Forces and other military health units and is also the case of the SAMS through the SAMS Hospital and SAMS clinics.

Health insurances

The health insurances complement both the SNS and the health subsystems, with the adherence to them being usually voluntary (although there are some mandatory health insurances). Being considered a healthcare complementary activity, the health insurances are also under the supervision of the Ministry of Health.

The insurances healthcare services are provided to the insured persons through either direct or free schemes. In the direct scheme the services are provided by medical establishments which have a previous convention with the insurance network. In the free scheme, the services are provided by entities with no previous conventions, with the insured person advancing the payment and then being reimbursed by the insurance.

A number of health insurance networks exist in Portugal, with the larger ones being the Multicare (part of Fidelidade insurance group), the AdvanceCare (joint venture of several insurance corporations) and the Medis (part of BCP group).

Emergency medical services

The Integrated System of Medical Emergency (SIEM) is the main emergency medical service of Portugal, managed by the National Medical Emergency Institute (INEM), an agency of the Ministry of Health. It is activated by the emergency number 1-1-2, under the coordination of four regional urgent patients guidance centers (CODU) and an additional CODU for emergencies at the sea. The SIEM also includes an anti-poison information center (CIAV) and a subsystem for the emergency transportation of high risk newborns to specialized hospital units (TIP).

Under the coordination of the CODU, a number of specialized mobile resources operate, including ambulances, fly cars, air ambulances, motorcycle ambulances and disaster response vehicles. The ambulances are either directly operated by the INEM from its regional branches or are operated from the medical emergency and reserve posts installed in the local fire departments or in the local branches of the Portuguese Red Cross.

The interface between the pre-hospital emergency care and the hospital care is made through three levels of urgency services. The basic emergency services (SUB) deal only with basic medical-only or very simple surgical emergencies. The medical-surgical emergency services (SUMC) deal with medical and also surgical emergencies. The polyvalent emergency services (SUP) deal with the most serious emergencies that need a very differentiated medical and/or surgical treatment. The SUB are installed in the ACES, the SUMC are installed in the hospitals or hospital centers and the SUP are usually installed only in group III hospital establishments.

Although also supporting the Portuguese Atlantic islands with some specialized services, the SIEM covers mainly the territory of Continental Portugal, with the Azores and Madeira having their own separate medical emergency services. In Madeira, the services are provided by the Regional Medical Emergency Service (SEMER), which has features similar to those of the INEM. In the Azores, the medical emergency services are provided by the local fire departments under the coordination of the Regional Civil Protection and Fire Service.

Hospitals

Public hospitals
The public hospitals are part of the National Health Service (SNS) or of the regional health services (SRS) of the Portuguese Atlantic islands.

Although some hospitals continue to constitute themselves separate administrative hospital establishments, most of the hospital units are now administratively grouped in hospital super-establishments designated "hospital centers" (centros hospitalares). A next phase of hospital administration is being implemented, with the creation of comprehensive health mega-establishments designated "local health units" (unidades de saúde local, ULS). The ULS group not only the hospitals but also the health centers located in the same city or region, integrating the providing of both primary and secondary healthcare in a single administrative unit. Most of the public hospital establishments constitute State-owned enterprises (entidades públicas empresariais, EPE). However, some public hospitals are managed by private entities as public-private partnerships (PPP).

In terms of service, the SNS hospitals, hospital centers and ULS are either classified as group I, II, III or IV (this being subdivided in the IV-a, IV-b and IV-c groups): 
 Group I are hospital establishments with an area of direct influence of 75 000 to 500 000 inhabitants, providing the medical and surgical valences of internal medicine, neurology, medical pediatrics, psychiatry, general surgery, orthopedics, anesthesiology, radiology, clinical pathology, hemotherapy and rehabilitation medicine. Group I hospitals can also provide some additional valences like ophthalmology and cardiology, but never provide the valences of medical genetics, allergology, pediatric cardiology, vascular surgery, neurosurgery, plastic surgery, cardiothoracic surgery, maxillofacial surgery, pediatric surgery and neuroradiology; 
 Group II hospitals provide the group I valences in their own area of direct influence and also provide the medical and surgical valences of ophthalmology, pneumology, cardiology, rheumatology, gastroenterology, nephrology, clinical hematology, infectiology, medical oncology, neonatology, allergology, gynecology-obstetrics, dermatology-venereology, otorhinolaryngology, urology, vascular surgery, neurosurgery, pathological anatomy, nuclear medicine and neuroradiology in an indirect area of influence. Group II hospitals can also have additional valences, except those of clinical pharmacology, medical genetics, pediatric cardiology, cardiothoracic surgery and pediatric surgery;
 Group III are hospitals that provide all medical and surgical specialties in both direct and indirect areas of influence. The providing of some highly specialized valences like medical genetics, pediatric cardiology, cardiothoracic surgery and pediatric surgery is reserved to group III hospitals;
 Group IV hospitals are those specialized in the areas of oncology (group IV-a), rehabilitation medicine (group IV-b) and psychiatry and mental health (group IV-c).

Below, is the list of the Portuguese public hospitals establishments, divided by the health regions of the SNS (North, Center, Lisbon and Tagus Valley (LVT), Alentejo and the Algarve), the Autonomous Region of the Azores (SRS of Azores) and the Autonomous Region of Madeira (SRS of Madeira):

Social hospitals
The social hospitals, are those ones managed by private institutions of social solidarity, namely the traditional Portuguese misericórdias (holy houses of mercy). These hospitals have agreements with the National Health Service, being public subsidized and providing healthcare to the users of that system in the same way as the public hospitals.

Historically, the misericórdias were the main hospital care providers in Portugal, since their creation in the end of the 15th century to the nationalization of the management of their hospitals in the 1970s. Traditionally, the State only kept the direct administration of some public hospitals, located mainly in Lisbon, Coimbra and Oporto. The vast majority of the rest of the hospitals were owned and managed by the misericórdias, although under the administrative and technical supervision of the State and inserted in the public hospital network. In 1974, the administration of all central and district hospitals owned by the misericórdias was nationalized and transferred to the State direct management, although not their property. In 1975, the same disposition was applied to the local hospitals and later to other specialized hospitals owned by the misericórdias. The Basic Law of Health of 1990 and the National Health Service Statute of 1993 allowed the devolution to the misericórdias of the administration of the hospitals owned by them. However, only some cases of devolution occurred.

Presently, there are 12 hospitals of social nature under the administration of the misericórdias.

Private hospitals
Portugal has a number of private hospitals mainly focused in providing medical care to the health subsystems (special professional health schemes) and private health insurance schemes beneficiaries.

Many of these are part of hospital and clinic networks owned by private healthcare corporations, with some major players being the Luz Saúde, SA (formerly a division of the Espírito Santo Financial Group and now part of the Fidelidade insurance group), the José de Mello Saúde, SA (the healthcare division of the Mello group) and the Lusíadas Saúde SGPS, SA (formerly part of the Caixa Geral de Depósitos group and now a division of the Brazilian Amil healthcare group).

Below is the list of some of the main private hospitals in Portugal:

Other hospitals
Hospital das Forças Armadas (military)
Hospital Real de Todos os Santos (destroyed by the 1755 Lisbon earthquake)
Hospitais Civis de Lisboa (extinct local network)
Santa Casa da Misericórdia (national network)

Health Cluster Portugal

Portugal has been identified as a center of competence in health connected activities, with the potential to become a cluster of excellence with international vocation.

In order to develop that potential, in 2008, several public and private organizations related with the health sector - including medical services providers, pharmaceutical industrial companies, universities and research and development entities - founded the Health Cluster Portugal (HCP). Its objective is to make Portugal a competitive player in the research, design, development, manufacture and marketing of products and associated health services in niche markets and selected technology, targeting the most demanding and most important international markets.

The strategy of the HCP focuses in the development of the following areas:
 Welfare and active ageing;
 Preventive medicine in the areas of neurodegenerative, cancer, cardiovascular, osteochondropathy, inflammatory, infective and metabolic diseases;
 Health tourism;
 eHealth.

See also
Access to healthcare for migrants in Portugal
Emergency medical services in Portugal
Health in Portugal

References

Healthcare in Portugal